Paint Creek runs through Jones, Haskell, and Throckmorton counties, and is the main tributary of the Clear Fork Brazos River.

Lake Stamford is formed where Paint Creek is impounded by Stamford Dam. The lake's primary inflow (and outflow) is Paint Creek.

One mile past (east) of Stamford Dam is a site called Scott Crossing. This is where California Creek, Paint Creek's most significant tributary, flows into Paint Creek. California Creek is the site of a diversion project to move water to Lake Stamford.

The nearby town of Paint Creek, Texas, was named after this creek.

See also
List of rivers of Texas

References

USGS Hydrologic Unit Map - State of Texas (1974)

Rivers of Texas
Rivers of Jones County, Texas
Rivers of Haskell County, Texas
Rivers of Throckmorton County, Texas